VH1 India is an Indian subscription music television and pop culture channel. It was launched in 2005 as a result of a joint venture between MTV India and Zee-Turner, based on the American channel of the same name. It broadcasts shows like VH1 Top 10, Hit Factory and Good Morning VH1. It also airs MTV international shows. It is now owned by Viacom18 (a joint venture of Paramount Global and TV18). VH1 India is also the last remaining VH1 channel to continue the usage of the 2003 VH1 logo, rather than adopting the 2013 logo used by other international VH1 channels.

Programming

Currently broadcast

Good Morning VH1 Entertainment TonightVH1 RewindVH1 HipHop Hustle
K-Popp'd
Vh1 Playlist
 Ligue 1
 NBA

Formerly broadcast

American Idol
Americas Got Talent
American Music Award
Asia's Got Talent
Billboard Music Award
Britain's Got Talent
Born Stylish
Brit Awards
The Buried Life
Catfish: The TV Show
Daria
Golden Globe Award
Grammy Award
Hogan Knows Best
Hollywood Film Awards
Jackass
Jersey Shore
Lip Sync Battle
MTV Europe Music Awards
MTV Movie & TV Awards
MTV Video Music Award
VH1 Gods of Guitar
Pimp My Ride 
Punk'd
Saturday Night Live
South Park
Shawn Mendes Unplugged
The X Factor UK (2007-2012)
Yo Momma
VH1 Music Diaries

Logos

See also
VH1

References

External links
 Official VH1 India Site
 Official Site Viacom 18
 
 Network 18
 Paramount

Television stations in Mumbai
Companies based in Mumbai
Network18 Group
Music television channels in India
Indian companies established in 2005
Television channels and stations established in 2005
VH1
Viacom 18
2005 establishments in Maharashtra